DEN may refer to:
 The IOC and FIFA country code for Denmark
 Denbighshire (historic), traditional county in Wales, Chapman code
 Denver, the capital of and largest city in the U.S. state of Colorado
 Denver International Airport's IATA code
 Stapleton International Airport's former IATA code
 Denver Union Station's Amtrak station code
 Denver Broncos, the city's National Football League team
 Denver Nuggets, the city's National Basketball Association team
 Digital Entertainment Network
 Diethylnitrosamine
 Denormal number

See also
 
 
 Den (disambiguation)

fr:DEN